Amel Riadhi Ouargla, known more commonly as AR Ouargla, is an Algerian association football club based in the Mekhedma neighborhood of Ouargla. The club currently plays in the center division of the Ligue Nationale du Football Amateur, the third highest division overall in the Algerian football system.

History
The club was founded in 1973 under the name of Mouloudia Club de Mekhedma, in the 2017-18 season, the club changed the name to Amel Riadhi Ouargla.

Crests

Players

Current squad

References

Football clubs in Algeria
Ouargla Province
Sports clubs in Algeria